The Peitz 101, aka Peitz Avionette, was a French amateur-built, all-metal light aircraft, first flown during the winter of 1931–32.

Design

The Peitz 101 was entirely the work of M. Peitz of Rosny-sous-Bois.  Without external funding or assistance, he began its construction in 1929. Structurally, it was an all-metal aircraft and was mostly metal-skinned, with the exception of its wings and rear fuselage which were fabric covered.

The Peitz 101 had a three-part parasol wing of rectangular plan out to slightly blunted tips and with an aspect ratio of 8.  There was no dihedral.  Ailerons filled about half the trailing edges.  The wings were built around two parallel duralumin spars and had a short-span central section braced to the upper fuselage longerons with a pair of parallel, vertical cabane struts to the spars, reinforced by rearward-sloping struts from the upper longeron to the forward spar. The outer wings were braced with parallel struts from the lower fuselage to the spars at about mid-span.

The fuselage of the Peitz 101 was constructed from dural tubes, with four longerons defining its rectangular section. It was skinned with  dural sheet over the forward section and with fabric aft. In an early diagram its  six-cylinder Anzani radial engine was shrouded within a Townend ring, though in a photograph the ring was not fitted. The  passenger's open cockpit was at the centre of gravity, between the two longerons, with the pilot in a similar cockpit close behind; both  were fitted with dual control. The rear fixed surfaces were triangular, with the tailplane mounted near the top of the fuselage. It carried elevators which were rectangular apart from a cut-out for rudder movement.  The rudder, unlike the elevators, was balanced.

The Peitz had a tail skid undercarriage with each wheel on a steel stub axle, hinged on a V-strut from the lower fuselage and with a short vertical elastic shock absorber leg to the forward wing strut  This junction was  strengthened by extra struts to the forward fuselage and to the top of the forward, vertical cabane strut and by another long strut outwards to the top of the rear wing spar.

Development

With limited resources and manpower, the construction of the Peitz 101 was slow. In October 1931 it was moved to Orly. The date of its first flight is not known, but test flying, with Brabant as pilot, began in the next few months. It appeared, with Service Technique de l'Aéronautique approval, in public at Orly in the Pentecost aviation festival in May 1932.  The following March it was awaiting tests for its certificat de navagbilité at Villacoublay.

Specifications

References

Parasol-wing aircraft
1930s French sport aircraft
Single-engined tractor aircraft
Aircraft first flown in 1932